The 1997 British Grand Prix was a Formula One motor race held at Silverstone on 13 July 1997. It was the ninth round of the 1997 Formula One season. Jacques Villeneuve won the race despite being stuck in the pitlane for half a minute during his first pitstop, after a wheelnut problem.

Two previous leaders retired from the race due to mechanical failures. Michael Schumacher led by over 40 seconds before a wheel bearing failure caused retirement. Mika Häkkinen seemed set for his first win but his engine blew while he was holding off Villeneuve, having made one stop to the Canadian's two.

Further back, Alexander Wurz scored his first podium finish in his third Grand Prix, also briefly leading the race during the pitstops. David Coulthard ran 3rd early on, but faded with braking problems. Schumacher's team-mate Eddie Irvine was close behind Villeneuve when both made their second pitstop, but his car failed as he exited the pits. The race was a disaster for Heinz-Harald Frentzen. He stalled on the grid with the race about to begin, forcing the race start to be aborted and having him to start from the back of the grid. Then on the first lap Jos Verstappen crashed into the back of his Williams car at Becketts' corner ending the German's race immediately.

Damon Hill finally scored his first points for the Arrows team after a late retirement for Shinji Nakano.

Classification

Qualifying

Notes
  – Norberto Fontana was relegated to the back of the grid.

Race

Championship standings after the race

Drivers'   Championship standings

Constructors'   Championship standings

 Note:   Only the top five positions are included for both sets of standings.

References

British Grand Prix
British Grand Prix
Grand Prix
British Grand Prix